General elections were held in Montserrat on 18 November 2019 for the nine elected seats in the Legislative Assembly. The result was a victory for the opposition Movement for Change and Prosperity, which won five of the nine elected seats.

Electoral system
The Legislative Assembly has eleven members, of which nine are elected. The other two seats are taken by the Attorney General and the Financial Secretary. The territory is a single nine-member constituency, with voters able to vote for up to nine candidates on their ballot paper under plurality-at-large voting.

Campaign
A total of 35 candidates contested the elections. The Movement for Change and Prosperity was the only party to put forward a full slate of nine candidates, with the ruling People's Democratic Movement (PDM) putting forward seven. Two new parties contested the elections; the Montserrat United Labour Party had five candidates and the Montserrat National Congress three. Eleven independent candidates also ran, including incumbent Premier Donaldson Romeo, who announced he would run as an independent after he was ousted as leader of the PDM shortly after announcing the elections had been called.

Results
The Movement for Change and Prosperity gained three seats, earning a majority in the Legislative Assembly. The People's Democratic Movement lost four seats and was reduced to only three MLAs. Romeo was re-elected as the sole independent MLA.

References

Montserrat
Montserrat
Elections in Montserrat
General
Montserrat